Fame is the Spur is a 1947 British drama film directed by Roy Boulting. It stars Michael Redgrave, Rosamund John, Bernard Miles, David Tomlinson, Maurice Denham and Kenneth Griffith. Its plot involves a British politician who rises to power, abandoning on the way his radical views for more conservative ones. It is based on the 1940 novel Fame Is the Spur by Howard Spring, which was believed to be based on the career of the Labour Party politician Ramsay MacDonald.

Plot
When Hamer Radshaw, a young man from a North country mill town, commits to help the poverty-stricken workers in his area, he takes as his Excalibur a sword passed down to him by his grandfather from the Battle of Peterloo, where it had been used against workers. As an idealistic champion of the oppressed, he rises to power as a Labour M.P., but is seduced by the trappings of power and finds himself the type of politician he originally despised.

Cast
 Michael Redgrave as Hamer Radshaw
 Rosamund John as Ann
 Bernard Miles as Tom Hannaway
 Carla Lehmann as Lady Lettice
 Hugh Burden as Arnold Ryerson
 Marjorie Fielding as Aunt Lizzie
 Seymour Hicks as Old Buck
 Anthony Wager as Hamer as a boy
 Brian Weske as Ryerson as a boy
 Gerald Fox as Hannaway as a boy
 Jean Shepeard as Mrs Radshaw
 Guy Verney as Grandpa
 Percy Walsh as Suddaby
 David Tomlinson as Lord Liskead
 Charles Wood as Dai            
 Milton Rosmer as Magistrate
 Wylie Watson as Pendleton
 Ronald Adam as Radshaws' Doctor 
 Honor Blackman as Emma
 Campbell Cotts as Meeting chairman
 Maurice Denham as Prison doctor
 Kenneth Griffith as Wartime Miners' Representative 
 Roddy Hughes as Wartime Miners' Spokesman 
 Vi Kaley as Old Woman in Election Crowd 
 Laurence Kitchin as Radshaws's secretary
 Philip Ray as Doctor
 Gerald Sim as Reporter
 Harry Terry as Man in Election Crowd
 Iris Vandeleur as Woman Who Opens Front Door
 H Victor Weske as Wartime Miners' Representative 
 Ben Williams as Radical Orator

Critical reception
In The New York Times at the time of the 1949 American release, Bosley Crowther commented: "this John and Roy Boulting film has vivid authority and fascination...But, unfortunately, a full comprehension of the principal character in this tale is missed in the broad and extended panorama of his life that is displayed...Mr. Redgrave is glib and photogenic; he acts the 'lost leader' in a handsome style. But he does not bring anything out about him that is not stated arbitrarily";

The Radio Times reviewer David Parkinson has praised Redgrave's "powerhouse performance, with his gradual shedding of heartfelt beliefs as vanity replaces commitment having a chillingly convincing ring. But such is Redgrave's dominance that there's little room for other characters to develop or for any cogent social agenda." According to Allmovie, the film is "sometimes slow-moving", but "is an interesting look into the reasons why the Labor [sic] and the Conservative factions are at loggerheads with each other in Great Britain".

External links

Review of film at Variety
Archived copy of Nigel Balchin's screenplay c1946 at University of Birmingham

References

1947 films
1947 drama films
British drama films
British black-and-white films
1940s English-language films
Films about politicians
Two Cities Films films
Films directed by Roy Boulting
Films set in London
Films with screenplays by Nigel Balchin
1940s British films